Cherry Grove, located on property formerly called Fredericksburg, 400 acres patented by Orlando Griffith's oldest son Henry Griffith in 1750. Cherry Grove is a historic home and former plantation located at Woodbine, Howard County, Maryland, United States. The home is considered the seat of the Warfield family of Maryland.

The multi-part house was built by Captain Benjamin Warfield starting after 1766 after acquiring a 550-acre land grant from Henry Griffith named "Fredericksburg". The complex includes a ca. 1798 log ground barn, an 1860-1890 frame wagon shed with corn crib, an early-20th century frame water tower, frame ground barn with cantilevered forebay, frame shed, frame dairy barn, concrete silo, concrete block dairy, and several frame shelter sheds. The buildings are located on a generally flat site surrounded by gently rolling terrain and are set well back from the road along a gravel drive that winds through the center of the farm. The J.P Tarenz log house was a log slave quarters built around 1768 that was moved offsite after the Civil War to accommodate people freed from slavery. The remains of Maryland's 45th Governor Edwin Warfield (1848–1920), are buried onsite in the family cemetery.

The property was owned by Arthur G. Nichols Jr. and wife in 1976 and was subdivided down to 338 acres.

Cherry Grove was listed on the National Register of Historic Places in 2007.

See also
List of Howard County properties in the Maryland Historical Trust
Sunnyside (Woodbine, Maryland)
Oakdale Manor

References

External links
, including undated photo, at Maryland Historical Trust

Houses on the National Register of Historic Places in Maryland
Houses completed in 1798
Howard County, Maryland landmarks
Houses in Howard County, Maryland
National Register of Historic Places in Howard County, Maryland
Slave cabins and quarters in the United States
Plantations in Maryland